George Mitchell Seabroke FRAS (1 April 1848 – 1 April 1918) was an English astronomer.

He began his astronomical career at Rugby School, where he was a student.  Together with the school's Mathematics and Science Master, James Wilson (later Canon of Worcester), he observed double stars at Temple Observatory.

He remained at the observatory, carrying out observations and promoting the study of astronomy to the schoolboys of Rugby School.

He was one of the founders of the British Astronomical Association, and served as its Double Star Section Director from 1892 to 1915, its Saturn Section Director from 1899 to 1911, and its national president from 1900 to 1902. He also served as Midland Branch President from 1902 to 1903.

References

External links
 
 The 8-inch refractor of the Temple Observatory, Rugby

Obituaries
 MNRAS 79 (1919) 231
 Obs 41 (1918) 226

1848 births
1918 deaths
People educated at Rugby School
19th-century British astronomers
20th-century British astronomers